The View from the Seventh Layer is a collection of 13 short stories by American author Kevin Brockmeier. The stories' genres include fables, science fiction, fairy tales, and a choose-your-own-adventure story. Each of the stories ties to the theme of considering big life questions through ordinary characters and ordinary problems.

Stories 
 A Fable Ending in the Sound of a Thousand Parakeets
 The View from the Seventh Layer
 The Lives of the Philosophers
 The Year of Silence
 A Fable with a Photograph of a Glass Mobile on the Wall
 Father John Melby and the Ghost of Amy Elizabeth
 The Human Soul as a Rube Goldberg Device: A Choose-Your-Own-Adventure Story
 The Lady with the Pet Tribble
 A Fable Containing a Reflection the Size of a Match Head in Its Pupil
 Home Videos
 The Air Is Full of Little Holes
 Andrea Is Changing Her Name
 A Fable with Slips of White Paper Spilling from the Pockets

References 

American short story collections
2008 short story collections
Pantheon Books books
Speculative fiction short story collections